Depoe Bay is a city in Lincoln County, Oregon, United States, located on U.S. Route 101 on the Pacific Ocean. The population was 1,398 at the 2010 census. The bay of the same name is a  harbor that the city promotes as the world's smallest navigable harbor.

History
Depoe Bay was named for Siletz Indian Charles "Charley" Depot who was originally allotted the land in 1894 as part of the Dawes Act of 1887. There are conflicting accounts of the origin of his name.  One says he was given the name "Depot Charley" for working at the military depot near Toledo, Oregon. The family was later known as "DePoe".  His original tribal affiliation was Tututni.

In 1975, the fishing trip sequence in One Flew Over the Cuckoo's Nest was filmed in Depoe Bay.

In 1983, the harbor sequence in Hysterical was filmed in Depoe Bay, with the Depoe Bay Bridge prominent in the background.

In 2008, restaurant scenes from The Burning Plain were filmed in Depoe Bay, at the Tidal Raves restaurant.

On March 11, 2011, Depoe Bay's port was damaged by a tsunami caused by the Tōhoku earthquake off the coast of Japan.

On August 21, 2017, Depoe Bay became one of the first places in the United States to witness totality of the solar eclipse.

Geography

Demographics

2010 census
As of the census of 2010, there were 1,398 people, 714 households, and 411 families living in the city. The racial makeup of the city was 92.9% White, 1.5% Native American, 1.2% Asian, 0.2% Pacific Islander, 1.5% from other races, and 2.6% from two or more races. Hispanic or Latino of any race were 4.8% of the population.

There were 714 households, of which 10.6% had children under the age of 18 living with them, 48.7% were married couples living together, 6.0% had a female householder with no husband present, 2.8% had a male householder with no wife present, and 42.4% were non-families. 32.8% of all households were made up of individuals, and 13.3% had someone living alone who was 65 years of age or older. The average household size was 1.96 and the average family size was 2.39.

The median age in the city was 56.6 years. 9.7% of residents were under the age of 18; 5% were between the ages of 18 and 24; 16.5% were from 25 to 44; 38.9% were from 45 to 64; and 29.8% were 65 years of age or older. The gender makeup of the city was 48.1% male and 51.9% female.

2000 census
As of the census of 2000, there were 1,174 people, 584 households, and 359 families living in the city. The population density was 652.2 people per square mile (251.8/km2). There were 911 housing units at an average density of 506.1 per square mile (195.4/km2). The racial makeup of the city was 92.50% White, 0.34% African American, 1.70% Native American, 0.60% Asian, 0.17% Pacific Islander, 1.02% from other races, and 3.66% from two or more races. Hispanic or Latino of any race were 3.58% of the population.

 There were 584 households, out of which 17.0% had children under the age of 18 living with them, 51.4% were married couples living together, 7.0% had a female householder with no husband present, and 38.5% were non-families. 31.0% of all households were made up of individuals, and 11.3% had someone living alone who was 65 years of age or older. The average household size was 2.01 and the average family size was 2.43.

In the city, the population was spread out, with 14.4% under the age of 18, 3.9% from 18 to 24, 22.1% from 25 to 44, 35.7% from 45 to 64, and 23.9% who were 65 years of age or older. The median age was 50 years. For every 100 females, there were 99.0 males. For every 100 females age 18 and over, there were 93.6 males.

The median income for a household in the city was $35,417, and the median income for a family was $43,967. Males had a median income of $28,750 versus $25,469 for females. The per capita income for the city was $24,994. About 5.5% of families and 8.0% of the population were below the poverty line, including 15.1% of those under age 18 and 2.1% of those age 65 or over.

Media 
Depoe Bay is served by radio station KPPT-FM, licensed to broadcast at 100.7 MHz. Owned by  Agpal Broadcasting, the station specializes in classic hits.

See also

Gracie's Sea Hag, seafood restaurant
Whale Cove
Whale Watching Center, a state park featuring a staffed visitor center

Notes

References

External links

 Entry for Depoe Bay in the Oregon Blue Book

Bays of Oregon
Cities in Oregon
Oregon Coast
Populated coastal places in Oregon
Cities in Lincoln County, Oregon
Seaside resorts in Oregon
1973 establishments in Oregon
Bodies of water of Lincoln County, Oregon